Grand Traverse Mall is an enclosed shopping mall serving Traverse City, Michigan, located in Garfield Township. Opened in 1992, the mall features five anchor stores: JCPenney, Target, Dunham's Sports, TJ Maxx, and Macy's. It is managed by Brookfield Properties, the successor of its original developer General Growth Properties.

History
The mall opened in phases: JCPenney and Target opened in October 1991, followed by the mall itself in March 1992 and Hudson's in July. It featured 110 stores and a nine-screen Kerasotes Theatres complex, making it the largest mall north of Saginaw, Michigan. As with all other Hudson's stores in Michigan, the Grand Traverse Mall location converted to Marshall Field's in 2001 and Macy's in 2006.

Before its opening, it was involved in a lawsuit started by an existing mall in town (Cherryland Mall, now Cherryland Center) over concerns that mall construction would pollute a nearby creek, and that it would add too much retail space to the region. This lawsuit was settled out of court. Another lawsuit, regarding conflict of interest among township officials who sold land to the mall developers, was ruled in favor of the developers. General Growth Properties, which developed the mall, transferred ownership to Rouse Properties in 2012.

In October 2014, a dead body was found at the mall, causing it to be closed for a day while the body was investigated. The body was eventually determined to be a night shift custodian. Gap and Old Navy both closed at nearby Horizon Outlets (now Buffalo Ridge Shopping Center), both moving into new spaces at Grand Traverse Mall. The space occupied by Old Navy was previously an f.y.e. store and the space occupied by Gap was previously an Abercrombie & Fitch and Toys R Us Express. The Gap closed in 2021.

The mall's movie theater complex closed in 2015 when a newer theater was built by owner Carmike Cinemas. Mall officials announced in 2016 that the theater space would be demolished for a Dick's Sporting Goods, originally to open in Fall 2016. Dick's canceled its plans to open the store in December 2016, The space instead became Dunham's Sports. The store opened on October 27, 2017.

An H&M clothing store, added to the mall in 2017, closed in 2021. It was replaced by Grand Traverse Bay Gymnastics in 2021. The mall also gained Shoe Dept. Encore in 2019.

References

External links
Grand Traverse Mall

Shopping malls in Michigan
Brookfield Properties
Shopping malls established in 1992
Traverse City, Michigan
Buildings and structures in Grand Traverse County, Michigan
1992 establishments in Michigan